The Battle for the Soul of the Nation was a speech given by U.S. President Joe Biden on September 1, 2022, two months before the 2022 midterm elections. It was televised during prime time from the front of Philadelphia's Independence Hall. Biden was critical of Donald Trump and Republicans adhering to the Make America Great Again movement.

Background 
Joe Biden had publicly used the theme of the speech prior to being elected president. In August 2017, a piece in the Atlantic was published, "We Are Living Through a Battle for the Soul of This Nation", referring to the events of the Unite the Right rally in Charlottesville, Virginia and then-President Trump's public response to it. In August 2019 during the primary election season, he echoed the same message in a video, calling it "home to a defining moment for this nation". Following his victory in the 2020 United States presidential election, Biden again referred to this theme, saying "in this battle for the soul of America, democracy prevailed."

The speech was delivered approximately two months prior to the 2022 midterm elections. Biden suffered from poor approval ratings in the months prior to the address, although his numbers were experiencing a rebound at the time due to legislative achievements by Democrats in Congress.

Speech
The speech was given outside Independence Hall in Philadelphia, where the United States Declaration of Independence and the United States Constitution were debated and adopted by America's Founding Fathers. Biden delivered the speech in front of an audience of a few hundred invited guests.

A main theme of the speech was Donald Trump and his political allies, so-called "MAGA Republicans", who Biden described as a threat to the country and democracy. He contrasted them against "mainstream Republicans" who he portrayed as less extreme. Biden expressed his support for the both the Department of Justice's and the FBI's investigation into Trump.

Biden denounced the promotion of violence and the use of force, saying that "It's never appropriate. Never." He also spoke about stricter gun laws.

Biden said in the speech that those who voted for Trump in 2020 "weren't voting for attacking the Capitol, they weren't voting for overruling an election", and in a response to a journalist's question, he said "I don't consider any Trump supporter to be a threat to the country."

The speech was noted as a contrast and turnaround from Biden's typical message of bipartisanship since the 2020 Presidential Election. To hecklers who interrupted the speech with the anti-Biden chant of "Let's Go Brandon", he responded, "Good manners is nothing they’ve ever suffered from".

Reactions
The speech was noted for deviating from Biden's typical approach towards compromise and bipartisanship. An article in The Atlantic explains the rationale behind this alteration: “Ladies and gentlemen,” he said, “we can’t be pro-insurrectionist and pro-American. They’re incompatible. We can’t allow violence to be normalized in this country. It’s wrong.”

Many Republicans harshly criticized Biden's speech as divisive. On September 4 in a rally, Trump said it was "the most vicious, hateful, and divisive speech ever delivered by an American president." House Minority Leader Kevin McCarthy wrote on Twitter that "President Biden has chosen to divide, demean, and disparage his fellow Americans—simply because they disagree with his policies." The Washington Post editorial board criticized Biden's speech for partisanship.

The prime time address was not televised by some major networks. According to The Guardian, NBC showed Law and Order, CBS aired Young Sheldon, and ABC had Press Your Luck on. During some of the coverage the camera framed the exterior brick of Independence Hall illuminated in red lighting, along with two uniformed Marines in the background. Some pundits applauded the overall tone.

References

External links
 Remarks by President Biden on the Continued Battle for the Soul of the Nation

2022 in Philadelphia
2022 speeches
2022 in American politics
September 2022 events in the United States
Speeches by Joe Biden
Democratic Party (United States) events
Anti-fascism in the United States
Criticism of Donald Trump
Biden administration controversies
Independence National Historical Park